Recuperation can refer to:
 Recuperation (recovery), a period of physical or mental recovery
 Recuperation (politics), a concept of cultural normalisation of radical ideas
 Convalescence, the gradual recovery of health
 Recuperation (electric vehicles), the process by which electric vehicles recharge their batteries through Regenerative braking when braking to decelerate or stop